Lactarius eucalypti is a species of milk-cap fungus in the family Russulaceae. Found in Australia, it was described as new to science in 1987 by Orson K. Miller, Jr. and Roger N. Hilton. The mushroom grows on the ground in woodlands of jarrah (Eucalyptus marginata), karri (E. diversicolor) and marri (Corymbia calophylla). Fruiting only generally occurs during years of higher rainfall, the mushrooms appearing in May and June.

The orange-brown cap is convex and may become flat with age, and measures 1.8 to 3.1 cm across.

References

External links

eucalypti
Fungi described in 1987
Fungi native to Australia